Mananga in Mpumalanga is a border post between South Africa and the north of Eswatini. The border is open between 07:00 and 18:00.

References

Eswatini–South Africa border crossings